Raja Iskandar Dzurkarnain ibni Almarhum Sultan Idris Iskandar Al-Mutawakkil Alallahi Shah Afifullah (born 8 February 1955) is the Raja Di-Hilir (Deputy Crown Prince) of Perak and the second in the line of succession to the throne of the Malaysian state of Perak since 20 June 2014.

Biography
Raja Iskandar Dzurkarnain was born on 8 February 1955 at Hospital Kuala Kangsar, Kuala Kangsar  in then Federation of Malaya. 
He is the son of Sultan Idris Shah and Raja Muzwin.

Education
Raja Iskandar Dzurkarnain was educated at Sekolah Menengah Kebangsaan Clifford, Kuala Kangsar. He continued his studies in London.

Personal life
He married Her Royal Highness Tunku Soraya, daughter of Almarhum Sultan Abdul Halim Muadzam Shah and Almarhumah Sultanah Hajjah Bahiyah Tuanku Abdul Rahman, on 24 August 1986. They have three sons and two daughters.

Titles, honours and styles

  8 February 1955 - 5 January 1963 : His Highness (Yang Mulia) Raja Iskandar Dzurkarnain Ibni Raja Muda Idris
  5 January 1963 - 3 February 1984 : His Highness (Yang Mulia) Raja Iskandar Dzurkarnain Ibni Sultan Idris Iskandar Al-Mutawakkil Alallahi Shah II Afifullah
  3 February 1984 - 11 May 1987 : His Highness (Yang Teramat Mulia) Raja Iskandar Dzurkarnain Ibni Almarhum Sultan  Idris iskandar Al-Mutawakkil Alallahi Shah II Afifullah, The Raja Kechil Bongsu Perak Darul Ridzuan.
  11 May 1998 - 10 March 2010 : His Highness (Yang Teramat Mulia) Raja Iskandar Dzurkarnain Ibni Almarhum Sultan Idris Iskandar Al-Mutawakkil Alallahi Shah II Afifullah, The Raja Kechil Tengah Perak Darul Ridzuan.
  10 March 2010 - 18 March 2010 : His Highness (Yang Teramat Mulia) Raja Iskandar Dzurkarnain Ibni Almarhum Sultan Idris Iskandar Al-Mutawakkil Alallahi Shah II Afifullah, The Raja Kechil Sulung Perak Ridzuan,
  18 March 2010 - 20 June 2014 : His Highness (Yang Teramat Mulia) Raja Iskndar Dzurkarnain Ibni Almarhum Sultan Idris Iskandar Al-mutawakkil Alallahi Shah II Afifullah, The Raja Kechil Besar Perak Darul Ridzuan.
  20 June 2014 - present : His Royal Highness (Duli Yang Amat Mulia) Raja Iskandar Dzurkarnain Ibni Almarhum Sultan Idris Iskandar Al-Mutawakkil Alallahi Shah II Afifullah, The Raja Di-Hilir Perak Darul Ridzuan.

Honours
Honours of Perak
  Recipient of the Royal Family Order of Perak (DK, 27 August 2016)
  Member Second Class of the Azlanii Royal Family Order (DKA II)
  Grand Knight of the Order of Cura Si Manja Kini (the Perak Sword of State, SPCM)  with title Dato' Seri—current ribbon : 

Honours of Johor
  Royal Family Order of Johor :
 Second Class - Darjah Kerabat Yang Amat Dihormati Pangkat Kedua (DK II, 23 March 2017)

Honours of Kedah
  Knight Grand Companion of the Order of Loyalty to the Royal House of Kedah with title Dato' Seri (SSDK)

Honours of Malaysia
 Commander of the Order of Loyalty to the Crown of Malaysia with title Tan Sri (PSM, 20 October 2016)

References 

|-

Royal House of Perak
Living people
Year of birth missing (living people)
Commanders of the Order of Loyalty to the Crown of Malaysia
Sons of monarchs